The Coquitlam Adanacs are a Canadian box lacrosse team based in Coquitlam, British Columbia. The Adanacs play in B.C.'s seven team Western Lacrosse Association (WLA), whose champion competes against Ontario's Major Series Lacrosse champion for the Mann Cup every September.

The Adanacs originally started as a basketball team during the 1920s in New Westminster. The team expanded to lacrosse and played as the Adanacs until 1951. In 1965, a new Coquitlam Adanacs lacrosse team was formed by old Adanac players, and won the Mann Cup in 2001.

The Adanacs play their home games at the Poirier Sport & Leisure Complex.

The Adanacs hold the unique distinction of winning the "Nations in 1980" the first world championship of indoor (box in Canada) lacrosse by defeating the North American Natives, composed of First Nations players, in a nationally televised game from Vancouver's Pacific Coliseum on July 17, 1980. This event was also unique in that the North American Natives were the first to team to ever represent First Nations people in a world championship in any sport.

Trivia
 The name "ADANAC" is simply "CANADA" spelled backwards.
 The team played the 1968 season in Portland, Oregon, but returned the following season.

All-time record

External links
Coquitlam Adanacs homepage
Western Lacrosse Association

Sport in Coquitlam
Western Lacrosse Association teams
Sports teams in Portland, Oregon
1965 establishments in British Columbia
Lacrosse clubs established in 1965